United Grain Company is a Russian grain trading company based in Moscow and established in 2007. The company conducts grain procurement activities in Russia, and manages exports on international markets.

History 
The United Grain Company was established on March 21, 2007 as a result of the transformation of the FGUP "Federal Agency for the Regulation of the Food Market" under the Ministry of Agriculture of the Russian Federation, the main function of which was the implementation of state regulation of the grain market.

In 2012 Ziyavudin Magomedov's Summa Group bought a 50% minus one share stake in the company. In 2014 the company agreed to trade grain worth $500 million for oil with Iran.

The company will build a grain terminal in the Port of Zarubino, in the Russian Far East, by 2020. In August 2017 the Russian Government announced plans to privatize the company by 2019.

Current owners 
The shareholders of United Grain Company JSC are:
 The Russian Federation represented by the Federal Agency for State Property Management (Federal Property Management Agency) - 50% plus one share;
 VTB Bank's controlled Demetra Holding - 50% minus one share. Along with VTB, the owners of Demetra Holding are the Marathon Group (24.99%) and Agronova (25%).

References

External links
 Official website

Food and drink companies based in Moscow
Agriculture companies of Russia
Russian brands
Russian companies established in 2007
Government-owned companies of Russia
Agriculture companies established in 2007